Caumont may refer to:

Places in France
Caumont, Aisne, Picardy
Caumont, Ariège, Aquitaine
Caumont, Eure, Haute-Normandie
Caumont, Gers, Aquitaine
Caumont, Gironde, Aquitaine
Caumont, Pas-de-Calais, Nord-Pas-de-Calais
Caumont, Tarn-et-Garonne, Aquitaine
Caumont-l'Éventé, Calvados, Basse-Normandie
Caumont-sur-Durance, Vaucluse, Provence
Caumont-sur-Garonne, Lot-et-Garonne, Aquitaine
Caumont-sur-Orne, Calvados, Basse-Normandie
Château de Caumont, in Cazaux-Savès, Gers department, see List of châteaux in the Midi-Pyrénées

People
Caumont family, or Lords of Caumont, who bore the title of Duc de La Force
Arcisse de Caumont (1801-1873), French historian and archaeologist

Other
Caumont (chicken), a French chicken breed from Caumont-l'Eventé